Capoue is a surname. Notable people with the surname include:

 Aurélien Capoue (born 1982), French footballer
 Étienne Capoue (born 1988), French footballer, brother of Aurélien
 Jean-Michel Capoue (born 1972), French footballer